Nigeria submitted a film for the Academy Award for Best International Feature Film for the first time in 2019. However, on 4 November 2019, the Academy disqualified Nigeria's entry, as the majority of the film's dialogue is in English. However, the following year, the Nigerian Oscar Selection Committee announced that AMPAS would allow films that are primarily in Pidgin English to be eligible for submission.

The award is handed out annually by the United States Academy of Motion Picture Arts and Sciences to a feature-length motion picture produced outside the United States that contains primarily non-English dialogue. It was not created until the 1956 Academy Awards, in which a competitive Academy Award of Merit, known as the Best Foreign Language Film Award, was created for non-English speaking films, and has been given annually since.

Submissions
The Academy of Motion Picture Arts and Sciences has invited the film industries of various countries to submit their best film for the Academy Award for Best Foreign Language Film since 1956. The Foreign Language Film Award Committee oversees the process and reviews all the submitted films. Following this, they vote via secret ballot to determine the five nominees for the award. Below is a list of the films that have been submitted by Nigeria for review by the Academy for the award by year and the respective Academy Awards ceremony.

In 2022, Nigeria's Oscar Selection Committee announced they received three Yoruba-language submissions: Aníkúlápó, Elesin Oba, The King's Horseman and King of Thieves. They determined they would not enter because a majority of the selection committee voted that all three films were "non-eligible."

See also
List of Academy Award winners and nominees for Best Foreign Language Film
List of Academy Award-winning foreign language films

Notes

References

External links
The Official Academy Awards Database
The Motion Picture Credits Database
IMDb Academy Awards Page

Nigeria
Academy Award